Justin Lisso (born 12 December 1999) is a German ski jumper and representative of the club WSV Schmiedefeld am Rennsteig e.V. Junior world champion in the men's team competition and silver medallist in the mixed team competition (2018).

References

1999 births
Living people
German male ski jumpers